Luvsandashiin Dorj (born 15 July 1943) is a Mongolian cross-country skier. He competed at the 1980 Winter Olympics and the 1984 Winter Olympics.

References

1943 births
Living people
Mongolian male cross-country skiers
Olympic cross-country skiers of Mongolia
Cross-country skiers at the 1980 Winter Olympics
Cross-country skiers at the 1984 Winter Olympics
Place of birth missing (living people)
20th-century Mongolian people